St Mark's, Eastern Cape is a town in Chris Hani District Municipality in the Eastern Cape province of South Africa.

Village on the White Kei River, about 15 km west of Cofimvaba and 40 km north-east of Cathcart. It was founded in 1855 as one of four Anglican mission stations named after the apostles.

References

Populated places in the Intsika Yethu Local Municipality
Populated places established in 1855
1855 establishments in the British Empire